Nicholas David Schnell (born March 27, 2000) is an American professional baseball outfielder in the Tampa Bay Rays organization.

Amateur career
Schnell graduated from Roncalli High School in Indianapolis, Indiana. As a senior he batted .535 with 15 home runs and 37 RBIs and was named Indiana's Gatorade Baseball Player of the Year. For his high school career, he hit .473 with 25 home runs and 109 RBIs. He signed to play college baseball at the University of Louisville.

Professional career
Schnell was selected 32nd overall by the Tampa Bay Rays in the 2018 MLB draft and he signed for $2.3 million.

Schnell was assigned to the Rookie-level Gulf Coast League Rays where he homered in his first professional at-bat. Over 19 games for the Rays, he batted .239 with one home run and four RBIs. He returned to the GCL to begin 2019 before earning promotions to the Princeton Rays of the Advanced Rookie Appalachian League and the Bowling Green Hot Rods of the Class A Midwest League during the year. Over 55 games between the three clubs, he slashed .265/.325/.448 with five home runs and 31 RBIs. To begin the 2021 season, he was assigned to the Charleston RiverDogs of the Low-A East. He was placed on the injured list in mid-July and missed the rest of the season. Over 52 games prior to the injury, Schnell slashed .174/.300/.321 with eight home runs, 29 RBIs, and 13 stolen bases. He retruend to Charleston to open the 2022 season and batted .257 with three home runs and 19 RBIs over 38 games before missing the rest of the season with an injury.

References

External links

2000 births
Living people
Baseball players from Indianapolis
Baseball outfielders
Gulf Coast Rays players
Princeton Rays players
Bowling Green Hot Rods players
Charleston RiverDogs players